Metropolitan Onufriy (Onuphrius, secular name Orest Volodymyrovych Berezovsky; ; ; born 5 November 1944) is the primate of the Ukrainian Orthodox Church (Moscow Patriarchate), holding the title of Metropolitan of Kyiv and All Ukraine.

Biography 
He was born 5 November 1944 in Chernivtsi Oblast as the son of a priest. In 1961 he graduated from high school. From 1962 to 1964 he studied at the Chernivtsi technical school, after which he worked in construction organizations in Chernivtsi. In addition to his native Ukrainian, he also speaks Russian and Romanian.

In 1966, he joined the technical faculty of the Chernivtsi University, and in 1969, after the third year, entered in the second class of the Moscow Theological Seminary; the following year, he became part of the brotherhood of the Trinity Lavra of St. Sergius.

On 18 March 1971 he was tonsured a monk with the name Onufriy, in honor of St. Onuphrius the Great. On 20 June 1971 he was ordained a hierodeacon and on 29 May 1972 ordained a hieromonk.

After 18 years, Archimandrite Onufriy went back to Ukraine as the superior of the Pochayiv Lavra of the Holy Assumption.

In 1988, he graduated from the Moscow Theological Academy as a candidate in theology.

On 20 July 1988 he was appointed Father-Superior of the Dormition Pochayiv Lavra.

On 9 December 1990 he was consecrated Bishop of Chernivtsi and Bukovina by Metropolitan Philaret (Denysenko) at the St Volodymyr's Cathedral in Kyiv.

On 22 January 1992, Onufriy signed a request of the bishops of the Ukrainian Orthodox Church to Patriarch of Moscow and All Russia Alexy II for the erection of an autocephalous Church in Ukraine, and on January 23 Onufriy was transferred by Metropolitan Philaret (Denysenko) to the Ivano-Frankivsk diocese.

On 7 April 1992 he was restored by the Diocese of Chernivtsi, and served in this diocese for 23 years.

On 28 July 1994 Onufriy was elevated to the rank of archbishop and appointed a permanent member of the Holy Synod of the Ukrainian Orthodox church.

On 22 November 2000 Onufriy was elevated to the rank of Metropolitan.

On 23 November 2013 Onufriy was awarded by Metropolitan of Kyiv and All Ukraine Vladimir the right to wear the second Panagia.

On 24 February 2014 the Holy Synod of the Ukrainian Orthodox Church elected Onufriy by secret ballot locum tenens of the Kyiv metropolitan see, following the issuing of a medical certificate concerning the incapacity of Volodymyr, the Metropolitan of Kyiv and All Ukraine, to perform the duties of the Primate of the Ukrainian Orthodox Church.

On 13 August 2014 Onufriy was elected the new primate of the Ukrainian Orthodox Church and Metropolitan of Kyiv and All Ukraine of the Moscow Patriarchate (succeeding Metropolitan Volodymyr).

In February 2022, during the Russian invasion of Ukraine, along with other local bishops (such as the rival Epiphanius), he offered churches of his diocese as shelters from the bombings.

Views
Metropolitan Onufriy has referred to Ukraine's aspirations to join the European Union as a "tragedy".

Onufriy has voiced his support for the territorial integrity of Ukraine. Onufriy refused to stand up when the Ukrainian parliament honoured the Ukrainian fighters of the War in Donbass (against pro-Russian unionists), but later commented about it. In August 2014 Onufriy stated that there were no priests in the Ukrainian Church who supported separatism. His Church has mostly abstained from commenting on the 2014–15 Russian military intervention in Ukraine.

In February 2016 he said that "in a situation of continued military confrontation in eastern Ukraine, we emphasize that we unfailingly stand on the side of peace and support all peace initiatives of the Ukrainian authorities".

On the first day of the February 2022 Russian invasion of Ukraine Onufriy called the war "a disaster" stating that "The Ukrainian and Russian peoples came out of the Dnieper Baptismal font, and the war between these peoples is a repetition of the sin of Cain, who killed his own brother out of envy. Such a war has no justification either from God or from people." He also  expressed "our special love and support to our soldiers who stand guard and protect and defend our land and our people. May God bless and cherish them!".

References

External links

 
 

1944 births
Living people
People from Chernivtsi Oblast
20th-century Eastern Orthodox bishops
21st-century Eastern Orthodox bishops
History of Christianity in Ukraine
First Hierarchs of the Ukrainian Orthodox Church (Moscow Patriarchate)
Russian Orthodox bishops of Kyiv